, also known as Anime de Training EX, is a Japanese anime television series produced by Rising Force and Earth Star Entertainment. It debuted on October 12, 2015. It is streamed via Niconico and is also available on Crunchyroll. A second season , has begun airing in October 2016.

Plot
The series follows six young aspiring idols as they train and teach the audience using various exercise routines.

Characters

Age 16. 1st year high school girl. The lead girl. Known to her friends as "Asamichi". Does very well at sports, but not too well in her studies.

Age 14. 2nd year middle school girl. A little blonde girl with pigtails who wishes she can grow her breasts like the other girls. She hates natto, unlike Asami. Before the arrival of Sakura in the second season, she was the youngest of the original five.

Age 17. A wealthy, well-mannered girl with the temperament of a princess. She is the oldest of the six girls. She has a pet weasel, Andalucia.
She chose to train and become an idol, despite her father's opposition, but she is fortunate to be among Asami and co, who have the same aspirations she has.

Age 16. Her real first name is Akiko. She is a chuunibyou girl with heterochromia iridum (different colored eyes), claiming to be the "Princess of Denebrae" and using her talent as an idol to "bring doom to the world". She worked part-time at the MINI-SPOT convenience store in the first season. In the second season, she part-times at the TOMONI convenience store near a train station. She often tries to convince her friends (and the viewers) that her part-time work is a facade.
NOTE: In Episode 1 of the original series, Shion was first credited as "Convenience Store Clerk" as she appeared in a flashback of Asami's.

Age 15. A bespectacled girl who thinks negatively and is mainly shy, but over time while training with the others, her confidence grew. She constantly ends her sentences with "desu".

Age 14. 2nd year of middle school. The new girl. She rides a hoverboard and carries a plush toy killer whale. She talks old-fashionably and behaves like a spoiled little girl. She has a lot of toys in her room. She refers to herself as "Emperor Sakura".

Shizuno's pet weasel, known to be constantly naughty around Shizuno and her friends!

Eri's best friend from her school. She appears in Episode 2 of the second season, and for some reason, she thinks that Eri and the viewer are a couple.

She appears in Episode 4 of the second season briefly to deliver a pizza to Shion and the viewers, as thanks to the latter for looking after her daughter.

Anime

Season 1

Season 2

Notes

References

External links
 

Anime with original screenplays
Earth Star Entertainment